Lupao, officially the Municipality of Lupao, is a 3rd class municipality in the province of Nueva Ecija, Philippines. According to the 2020 census, it has a population of 45,917 people.

The town is derived from the Ilocano word lupa, the name of an itchy plant found in great abundance within the town and its outskirts at the time of the town's foundation in 1913.

History
During the Spanish rule, the territorial jurisdiction of the province of Nueva Ecija extended to as far south at Cabiao and the towns of San Quintin, Rosales, Balungao and (H)umingan in the north, which later on formed part of the province of Pangasinan. Lupao was a component barrio of Umingan. It remained so until 1871 when some residents led by a Señor Calderon petitioned the Governor General for the segregation of Lupao as a barrio of Umingan and the eventual creation of Lupao as “Tenencia Absoluta” to be headed by a Teniente Absoluto. On September 28, 1871, the Govierno Superior Civil de Filipinas decreed the creation of Lupao as Tenencia Absoluta. It signified the formal segregation as barrio and the eventual creation as “pueblo” of the province of Nueva Ecija. Under the Spanish rule, a pueblo is created through the Laws of the Indies and represented a local government unit. The pueblo was an agency of the Central Government.

Salvacion was the first barrio of Lupao. Its initial territory also included Barrio Cabaritan now known as San Jose City. Barangay San Roque was known as Odiao and San Isidro as Macaniaoed. Among the first leaders of the municipality during the twilight years of Spanish Rule were Benito Romualdo as “Capitan Municipal” and Celestino Jabalde as ‘Juez de Paz”.

In 1898, soon after the Treaty of Paris (1898) was signed and the payment of 20 million pesetas for the possession of the Philippines, the United States Military Government (USMG) issued General Order No. 43 proclaiming the establishment of municipal governments.  The Second Philippine Commission (the Taft Commission) acting as the upper house of a bicameral legislature then issued Act No.82 in 1901, “The 1901 municipal code” provided for popularly elected presidents (mayor), vice presidents (vice mayor), and councilors to serve on municipal boards.

It was only in 1913 that Lupao became a town mainly through the concerted efforts of Gen. Manuel Tinio and Assemblyman Isauro Gabaldon of the Philippine Assembly (lower house).  Its founding fathers were Victoriano Joanino, Calixto Laureta, Felix Carpio, Juan Briones, Anacleto Ganareal, Luis Mamaligsa, Gregorio Babagay, Sicto Baclig, Remigio Blas Caoile and Candido Mata.

During the Second World War, Japanese Imperial forces was occupied and entering the invaded the towns of Lupao in 1942.

In 1945, the combined U.S. and Philippine Commonwealth military ground troops was liberated and re-invasion the towns at Lupao and defeats Japanese Imperial forces started the Battle of Lupao and ended World War II. The established of the main headquarters of the Philippine Commonwealth Army and United States Army was active on 1945 to 1946 and stationed in Lupao, Nueva Ecija after the Battle of Lupao on 1945 between the Japanese and the combined Filipino-American troops.

Lupao Massacre
During a military operation against the New People's Army on February 10, 1987, seventeen civilians, including an elderly couple and six children, were murdered by the Alpha Company, 14th Infantry (Avengers) Battalion, of the Philippine Army. The murders were carried out by the 14th Infantry after they failed to capture the NPA who had killed the Second Lieutenant Edgar Dizon, the platoon leader of the government troops in a sneak attack the night before. In an act of frustration and anger, the 14th Infantry gathered up unarmed civilians hiding in the rice paddies and murdered them with gunfire and bayonets, leaving 17 dead and 8 wounded, claiming that the dead were members of NPA. All 24 soldiers of the 14th Infantry Battalion were eventually tried before military court but were all acquitted, despite first-hand testimonies of the survivors. This great act of deception and cover-up by the military became known as the infamous "Lupao Massacre."

On September 25, 2005, three NPA members were killed by soldiers of 71st Infantry Battalion during a hot pursuit operation against seven fully armed NPA in Barangay Cordero, Lupao.

Geography

Barangays
Lupao is subdivided into 24 barangays.

 Agupalo Este
 Agupalo Weste
 Alalay Chica
 Alalay Grande
 Barangay J.U.Tienzo
 Bagong Flores
 Balbalungao
 Burgos
 Cordero
 Mapangpang
 Namulandayan
 Parista
 Poblacion East
 Poblacion North
 Poblacion South
 Poblacion West
 Salvacion I
 Salvacion II
 San Antonio Este
 San Antonio Weste
 San Isidro
 San Pedro
 San Roque
 Santo Domingo

Climate

Lupao belongs to the first type of climate in the Philippines. This type of climate has two (2) pronounced seasons: dry from the month of November to April and Wet during the rest of the year. This type of climate is typically hot, humid and tropical and is generally affected by the neighboring topography and the prevalent wind direction that varies within the year.

Demographics

Residents in Lupao are called "Lupaoenian". Ilocano is widely spoken especially in the barrios. Population is predominantly Ilocano in origin, According to the 2007 census, Lupao had a population of 36,832 people, 80% Ilocano and 20% Tagalogs, Kapampangans and Pangasinans. The world war babies, veterans, baby boomers, teachers and farmers composed the majority of the population. Just like any other local municipality, the younger population would leave home to find work in major cities and abroad.

Economy

Local delicacies
Due to its history and cultural background, Lupaoenian cuisine is greatly influenced by the Ilocanos and Pangasinenses. Rice is a staple food. Bangus, bagoong and alamang from Dagupan. Tinapa or smoked fish is also a famous dish which was commonly made locally in Ubbog. Locals also love their vegetables such as diningdeng- a concoction of vegetables & fish sauce; and boiled kamote tops.
Goat "kalding" is a common treat for all occasions. It is a common ingredient on dishes such as pinapaitan, kilawin & adobo.

The locals are also fond of sweets like tinudok, espasol, puto, tambutambong, tupig, kalamay, ginataang bayabas and ingkiwar. Exotic food such as "Tapang usa" or venison, "Baboy-ramo"  or wild hog meat, Abu-os "ant egg" were predominantly catered from Namulandayan brought to city center until the late 1980s, which eventually led to the probable extinction of local deers and hogs in the mountainside.

Tourism
 Santo Domingo Dam
 Macanae Dam
 Macarina Resort
 Pinsal Falls

References

External links

Municipality of Lupao Official Website
 [ Philippine Standard Geographic Code]
Philippine Census Information
Local Governance Performance Management System

Municipalities of Nueva Ecija